Vasile Martinoiu (born 2 April 1934) is a Romanian operatic baritone. A long-time member of the Romanian National Opera, in 2004 he was made a Commander of the Ordinul "Meritul Cultural" (Order of Cultural Merit) for services to Romanian music.

Biography
Born in a family of musicians in Tirgu Jiu, Martinoiu discovered his vocal gift in his high school years, when he sang with various school choirs. After high school, he became a student at the Cornetti Conservatoire in Craiova. Three years later he moved to the Music Academy in Iași, from which he graduated in 1958.

In 1959, Martinoiu made a successful debut at the Musical Theatre in Galați as Count di Luna in Il trovatore. The Romanian Opera in Bucharest offered him the opportunity to become a permanent soloist with their organisation.

His completed special studies with baritone Carlo Tagliabue in Milan and at the Accademia Nazionale di Santa Cecilia in Rome between 1967–1968.

He has performed in numerous engagements in Europe and overseas, singing at the New York City Opera, Philadelphia Grand Opera, Baltimore Opera, and the Kennedy Centre in Washington. He has toured in Austria, Belgium, Bulgaria, China, France, Germany, Greece, Hungary, Italy, Poland, Russia, Sweden, Switzerland, Czech Republic, Slovakia, Thailand, Turkey, and the United States.

He has appeared in radio and TV broadcasts in Berlin, Bucharest, Budapest, Dresden, Goerlitz, Leipzig, Pécs, Sofia, Moscow, and Warsaw.

Prizes
He has participated in several international festivals of music and in 12 international canto competitions.
1965: grand prize at the Erkel Competition in Budapest, Hungary
1966: second prize at the Maria Calas Competition in Barcelona, Spain
1966: laureate title at the P.I. Tchaikovsky Competition in Moscow, Russia
1966: second prize at the s’Hertogenbosch International Competition in the Netherlands
1967: first prize for Bulgarian composed lieder, and third prize for canto at the International Competition in Sofia, Bulgaria
1967: second prize at the International Canto Competition in Toulouse, France
1967: second prize at the Francesco Viñas Competition in Barcelona, Spain
1968: second prize at the Voci Verdiane Competition in Busseto, Italy
1968: third prize at the Giuseppe Verdi Competition in Parma, Italy
1968: second prize at the International Competition in Verviers, Belgium
1969: first prize at the Achille Peri Competition at Reggio Emilia, Italy

Opera repertoire

Bizet: Carmen – Escamillo
Donizetti: La Favorite – Alfonse; Lucia di Lammermoor – Lord Ashton
Umberto Giordano: Andrea Chénier – Carlo Gerard
Gounod: Faust – Valentin
Leoncavallo: I Pagliacci – Tonio, Silvio
Mascagni: La Cavalleria Rusticana – Alfio
Puccini: Madama Butterfly – Scharpless; La Bohème – Marcello, Tosca – Baron Scarpia
Ravel: L’Heure espagnole – Ramiro
Rossini: Il Barbiere di Siviglia – Figaro
Verdi: Aida- Amonasro; Un Ballo in maschera – Renato; Don Carlo – Rodrigo; La Forza del destino – Don Carlo, Nabucco – Nabucco; Otello – Iago; Rigoletto – Rigoletto; Stiffelio – Stankar; La traviata – Germont; Il trovatore – Conte di Luna

Romanian opera parts

Enesco: Oedipus – Creon
Lerescu, E.: Ecaterina Teodoroiu – Dobre
Petri, N.: Trandafirii Doftanei – Bogdan
Trailescu, C.: Dragoste si jertfa – Lazar

Vocal-symphonic works and lieder
Beethoven, Borodin, Brahms, Donaudi, Enesco, Fauré, Gluck, Grieg, Haendel, Haydn, Leoncavallo, Massenet, Mendelssohn-B, Mahler, Mozart, Rachmaninov, Respighi, Saint-Saëns, Schubert, Schumann, Tchaikovsky, Thomas, Wolf

Romanian composers
Brediceanu, Constantinescu, Drăgoi, Eliade, Gheciu, Monţia

References

Bibliography
Rich, Maria F. Who's who in opera: an international biographical directory of singers, Arno Press, 1976, p. 345. 
Presedintele Romaniei, Decretul 34 din 7 februarie 2004, Monitorul Oficial al Romaniei, No. 172, 27 February 2004

1934 births
Living people
Romanian operatic baritones
20th-century Romanian male opera singers
People from Târgu Jiu